Indra Sistemas, S.A. is a Spanish information technology and defense systems company. Indra is listed on the Bolsa de Madrid and is a constituent of the IBEX 35 index.

Indra is organized around three business areas: information technologies, simulation & automatic test equipment, and defense electronic equipment.

Indra's portfolio ranges from consultancy, project development, and systems and applications integration to outsourcing of IT systems and business processes. This offer is structured into two primary segments: solutions and services (including outsourcing and application maintenance), and business processes where technology is a strategic and differentiating element (BPO).

Approximately a third of the company's annual revenues come from international markets. By geographical areas, Europe and the United States are the two international markets with the greatest weight and growth for Indra. Latin America is also a geographical area in which Indra is operating.

The following are among Indra's main business areas:

 Air traffic control systems — where it is one of the world's largest suppliers; Indra claims that a third of the world's air traffic is managed by systems developed by the company
 Ticketing systems developed for rapid transit systems — such as those in Madrid, Barcelona, Paris, Lisbon, Shanghai, Athens, Buenos Aires, Mumbai and Santiago de Chile
 Financial services
 Energy
 Electoral technology and processes
 Aircraft simulators
 Defense
 Health information systems

Shareholders structure 
According to official information, the current shareholder structure of the company is the following:

References

Companies based in the Community of Madrid
Information technology companies of Spain
Spanish brands
Defence companies of Spain
IBEX 35
Consulting firms established in 1993
Companies listed on the Madrid Stock Exchange
International information technology consulting firms
Spanish companies established in 1993
Consulting firms of Spain